Vsevolod Vladimirovich Krestovsky (February 23, 1840 – January 30, 1895) was a Russian writer who worked in the city mysteries genre.

Biography
Krestovsky came from an old family of Polish gentry (szlachta) with roots in nowadays Ukraine. In 1857 he enrolled in the Historico-Philological faculty of St Petersburg University. At the university he became friends with the radical critic Dmitry Pisarev, and wrote for the magazine Russian Word.

After his short association with the radical camp, he joined a group of moderate slavophiles which included Apollon Maykov, Lev Mei and others, and began publishing his works in Notes of the Fatherland, Time and Epoch. In 1860 he left the university to become a professional writer. His novel The Slums of Saint Petersburg (1864), a product of many hours of personal observation, gained him considerable popularity. 
 
In 1863 he traveled to Warsaw to take notes for his novel The Flock of Panurge (1869), about the January Uprising. In 1874 he wrote another novel, The Force, on the same subject. Both novels were reactionary in nature. In the 1880s Krestovsky became frankly and openly anti-Semitic in his political and social views. His blatantly anti-Semitic trilogy The Jews are Coming was published between 1888 and 1892. He died in Warsaw in 1895.

English translations
Knights of Industry, from Mystery Tales, The Continental Classics, Volume 17, Harper and Brothers, NY and London, 1909. from Archive.org

References

External links
 
 

1840 births
1895 deaths
People from Kyiv Oblast
People from Tarashchansky Uyezd
Russian male novelists
Russian dramatists and playwrights
Russian male dramatists and playwrights
Russian male short story writers
Ukrainian writers
Slavophiles
Russian nationalists
19th-century novelists from the Russian Empire
19th-century dramatists and playwrights from the Russian Empire
19th-century short story writers from the Russian Empire
19th-century Polish male writers
Saint Petersburg State University alumni